Haynesville is a town in northern Claiborne Parish, Louisiana, United States, located just south of the Arkansas border. The population was 2,039 in 2020.

Haynesville is known as the "Gateway to North Louisiana" and the "Butterfly Capital of Louisiana". Loice Kendrick-Lacy of Haynesville published Gardening To Attract Butterflies: The Beauty And The Beast (2012). Kendrick-Lacy begins with memories of her childhood, when she was introduced to butterflies by her grandmother.

History
The town of Haynesville is the namesake of the Haynesville Shale, an upper Jurassic formation that is difficult to define on a technical basis but nevertheless covers a broad region of western Louisiana and east Texas and contains a large natural gas resource.  On March 24, 2008, Chesapeake Energy announced a new natural gas discovery in the Haynesville Shale.  This announcement began a new chapter in the development of the Hayneville Shale and hastened the activities of several other companies in the play.

The town's churches include Baptist, United Methodist, Presbyterian, Missionary Baptist, Pentecostal, and Church of Christ. This part of the state was settled by Protestants from other parts of the South, more than by ethnic French, Louisiana Creole, Italian and Irish Catholics more typically found in the New Orleans area.

Material on the history of Haynesville can be found at the Herbert S. Ford Memorial Museum located across from the Claiborne Parish Courthouse in Homer.

Geography
Haynesville is located at  (32.961132, −93.138091).

It supports a native forest vegetation of loblolly pine, shortleaf pine, southern red oak, American sweet gum and hickory.

Demographics

As of the 2020 United States census, there were 2,039 people, 1,081 households, and 664 families residing in the town.

Government and infrastructure
The United States Postal Service operates the Haynesville Post Office.

Louisiana Department of Public Safety and Corrections operates the David Wade Correctional Center in an unincorporated section of Claiborne Parish near Haynesville.

Crime
In May 1999, the Haynesville Police Department discovered the skeletal remains of Shannon Capers, a 13-year-old girl who had been missing since March 8, 1997. She was found in the woods behind the Mill Street Apartments on the north side of town. Capers had lived in the apartments. She was known to have been murdered by her boyfriend, a local drug dealer named Maurice Tate.

Education

The Claiborne Parish School Board operates Haynesville Elementary School and Haynesville Junior/Senior High School.

Notable people
 Geoffrey Beene, American fashion designer, born August 30, 1924
 Demetric Evans, NFL football player (San Francisco 49ers)
 Doug Evans, former NFL football player (Green Bay Packers; Super Bowl XXXI champion)
 Frederick Douglass Kirkpatrick, musician known for his song "Everybody's Got a Right to Live," civil rights activist and co-founder of the Deacons for Defense and Justice, and minister in Louisiana and New York City
 John Sidney Garrett, Speaker of the Louisiana House of Representatives (1968–1972)
 Jim Haynes (1933–2021), leading figure in British counter-culture
 George H. Mahon, U.S. Representative from Texas's 19th congressional district from 1935 to 1979, was born in Mahon near Haynesville in 1900.
 Danny Roy Moore (1925–c. 2020), Louisiana state senator from Claiborne and Bienville parishes from 1964 to 1968
 Bob Odom, former Louisiana commissioner of Agriculture and Forestry
 Larry Sale, sheriff of Claiborne Parish from 1936 to 1944; bodyguard at the assassination of Huey Pierce Long, Jr.
 A. L. Williams, football coach at Fair Park High School, Woodlawn High School (both in Shreveport), Northwestern State University, and Louisiana Tech University; born in Haynesville in 1934; retired in Ruston
 Iberia Beatrice Hampton (1922–2016) mother of Fred Hampton, American activist and chairman of the Illinois Chapter of the Black Panther Party

Climate
The climate in this area is characterized by hot, humid summers and generally mild to cool winters.  According to the Köppen Climate Classification system, Haynesville has a humid subtropical climate, abbreviated "Cfa" on climate maps.

Photo gallery

See also

References

External links

Towns in Claiborne Parish, Louisiana
Towns in Louisiana